Ole Henrik Giørtz (born 10 January 1955 in Bærum) is a Norwegian jazz pianist, arranger and bandleader, the older brother of jazz singer Anne-Marie Giørtz. He is known from a number of recordings, and has contributed to several recordings and tours within bands such as Bazar, Chipahua, Erik Wøllo Quintet, Terje Rypdal Trio and Anne Grete Preus, and festival debut at Vossajazz 1977 and attended Moldejazz 1979, within the band Lotus.

Career 
Giørtz was within his sister's band Ab und Zu, where he also was a composer and arranger. He accounted for the commissioned work Den akustiske skygge (Moldejazz, 1993), and composed the music for Lars Saabye Christensen's Skrapjern og silke (1998) commissioned work for Moldejazz, which led to Edvard Prize nomination 1999. To "Sandvika Storbandfestival" skrev han Rhymes at Midnight (2004), fremført med Ab und Zu and Prime Time Orchestra. Giørtz played within the Brazilian-Norwegian Claudio & Cristina Latini Band, also here as arranger and producer in addition to musical performances. This cooperation gave rise to album releases Sol e Cachaça (1988) and Cor de Dendê (1990).
«Horns for hire".

Giørtz leads his own Quartet featuring Tore Brunborg (saxophone), Tine Asmundsen (bass), and Svein Christiansen (drums). Melodic jazz, playing compositions of Wayne Shorter, Herbie Hancock, Joe Henderson, Charlie Haden, and others.
In addition he wrote the book Noter og andre nøtter – en brukerveiledning i pop- og jazzharmonikk (2006).

Discography 
Within Bazar
1973: Det er ikke enkelt (Samspill)
1974: Drabantbyrock (Mai)

With Anne-Marie Giørtz
1983: Breaking Out (Odin Records)

Within Claudio & Cristina Latini Band
1988: Sol e Cachaça (IPE Records)
1990: Cor de Dendê (Bums Records)

Within Ab und Zu
1989: Ab und Zu (Curling Legs)
1996: Totally (Curling Legs)
2002: Spark of life (Curling Legs)

With Lars Saabye Christensen, Ole Henrik Giørtz, Anne Marie Almedal, Kristin Kajander & Elin Rosseland
1999: Skrapjern og silke (Grappa Music)

References

20th-century Norwegian pianists
21st-century Norwegian pianists
Norwegian jazz pianists
Norwegian jazz composers
1955 births
Living people
Musicians from Bærum
Ab und Zu members